Global Underground 028: Nick Warren, Shanghai is a DJ mix album in the Global Underground series, compiled and mixed by Nick Warren. The album peaked at #14 on the Billboard Top Electronic Albums.  Though Warren was inspired by the Shanghai scene, the album's music came from producers of thirteen different nationalities.

Warren’s 2003 Reykjavik mix was supposed to be his last for Global Underground. Disillusioned with the non-stop DJing treadmill, he had planned to settle in the studio and focus on his Way Out West production work, yet was constantly being asked when his next GU installment would appear.

He was also frustrated by the lack of a platform for some of the unsigned music he was regularly being given by new producers from around the world, so he agreed to do “one more” GU mix, with the focus on showcasing new talent and a wider range of music than his Icelandic mix.

Track listing

Disc one 
SJ Esau - "Fat Cat" – 7:49
Jacob Todd & Kelly Noland - "Somehow" (Aural Imbalance Remix) – 5:11
Alex Stealthy - "Once" (Sunseeker Remix) – 5:55
Way Out West - "Don't Forget Me" (Way Out West's Clifton High Instrumental Mix) – 6:10
Tini Tun - - "Over It"  – 5:45
Starecase - "Vapour Trails" – 5:43
Seyton - "The Drake Equation" – 6:55
BCML - "Horowitz" – 6:37
Starecase - "Sunshine" – 6:05
Yvel & Tristan - "Pillow" (Quasar Remix) – 8:44
Lustral - "Solace" (Gardner & Star Mix) – 7:02

Disc two 
Chimera - "Natural High" – 7:53
Morozov - "Fly Guitar" (Astero Breaks Remix) – 7:08
Pop Shuvit - "Conversations" (Shiloh Remix) – 8:36
Holden & Thompson - "Come to Me" (Club Mix) – 6:00
Blendbrank - "Synthetic Symphony" – 3:41
Hardfloor - "Acperience 1" – 9:06
Kosmas Epsilon - "Sorry for Being Rude" – 6:23
Marcel Schoenbrunn - "Maleta" – 3:34
Murat Uncuoglu - "Flame" – 6:09
Peter Martin - "Changing in the Face of Grace" – 8:00
Mercurio - "Simple Things" – 2:27
Derek Howell - "Your Touch" – 9:18

References

External links

Global Underground
2005 compilation albums